Kaipainen is a Finnish surname. Notable people with the surname include:

 Anu Kaipainen (1933-2009), Finnish writer
 Eino Kaipainen (1899–1995), Finnish actor
 Osmo Kaipainen (1933–1985), Finnish physician and politician
 Jouni Kaipainen (1956–2015)

Finnish-language surnames